Sir Philip Howard Otton (born 28 May 1933), styled The Rt Hon Sir Philip Otton, is a former Lord Justice of Appeal (1995–2001).

Career
Otton was educated at the University of Birmingham (LLB). In 1983, he was approved as a High Court Judge and assigned to the Queen's Bench Division. He was subsequently appointed as Lord Justice of Appeal in 1995. In 2004, he was appointed to the Court of Appeal in Gibraltar. He was judge of the Qatar Civil and Commercial Court from 2007 to 2011.

Judgments
Mothew v Bristol & West Building Society [1998] EWCA Civ 533, [1998] Ch 1 - leading English fiduciary law and professional negligence case, concerning a solicitor's duty of care and skill, and the nature of fiduciary duties; Otton concurring with Millett LJ

Awards and honours
Otton was awarded the Coventry Award of Merit in 2002. He holds honorary degrees from Nottingham Trent University, the University of Essex and the University of Birmingham.

References

1933 births
Living people
Alumni of the University of Birmingham
20th-century English judges
Queen's Bench Division judges
Lords Justices of Appeal
Knights Bachelor
Members of the Privy Council of the United Kingdom
21st-century English judges